Sahil Mehta (born 4 April 1988) is an Indian television actor known for starring as Yuvraj Birla on Suhani Si Ek Ladki and last seen as Sameer Singh on Shakti - Astitva Ke Ehsaas Ki.

Career
Mehta had starred in the Bollywood movie Love Express, opposite Neha Yadav. In 2014, he made his TV debut when he was cast as the leading role of Yuvraj in Suhani Si Ek Ladki opposite Rajshri Rani Jain on STAR Plus.
In 2018, he was cast as Sameer Singh on Shakti - Astitva Ke Ehsaas Ki on Colors TV.

Personal life
Sahil Mehta married longtime girlfriend Eesha Danait in 2016.

Filmography

Films

Television

Web series

References

External links
 

Living people
1988 births
Indian male film actors
Indian male soap opera actors
21st-century Indian male actors